

Expeditions, field work, and fossil discoveries
 William Edmund Cutler first began collecting fossils, choosing the mouth of Kneehills Creek in Alberta as a prospecting site. According to paleontologist Darren Tanke, Cutler was motivated by "commercial gain".
 Charles H. Sternberg and his sons began working under a contract with the Geological Survey of Canada, which at the time was responsible for maintaining the National Museum of Canada. Lawrence Lambe occupied a supervisory position in the project. The Sternbergs were in competition with Barnum Brown of the American Museum of Natural History through a period that came to be known as the Great Canadian Dinosaur Rush.

Institutions and organizations

Natural history museums
 The Calgary Public Museum of Alberta, Canada moved to occupy a single floor of the city's Memorial Park Library Building.

Scientific organizations

Scientific advances

Paleoanthropology

Paleobotany

Evolutionary biology

Exopaleontology

Extinction research

Micropaleontology

Invertebrate paleozoology

Trace fossils

Vertebrate paleozoology

Data courtesy of George Olshevsky's dinosaur genera list.

Research techniques

Fossil trade

Law and politics

Regulation of fossil collection, transport, or sale

Fossil-related crime

Official symbols

Protected areas

Ethics and practice

Hoaxes

Scandals

Unethical practice

People

Births

Awards and recognition

Deaths

Historiography and anthropology of paleontology

Pseudoscience

Popular culture

Amusement parks and attractions

Art

Comics

Film

Gaming

Literature
 The Lost World by Sir Arthur Conan Doyle was published. This novel was the first major fictional portrayal of dinosaurs in the 20th century. It was also the first work of fiction to depict dinosaurs as surviving somewhere in a remote wilderness refuge. Conan Doyle depicted the novel's dinosaurs as cold blooded and stupid. This accurately reflected the scientific thinking of the period, but is now obsolete. Paleontologist William A. S. Sarjeant has characterized Conan Doyle's dinosaurs as otherwise "excellently described".Conan Doyle also incorrectly accepted the prevailing scientific consensus of the period that pterosaurs were poor fliers who depended on gliding to travel. Nevertheless, Sarjeant also noted that while Conan Doyle underestimated pterosaur flying abilities, he anticipated the later scientific conclusion that they were social animals.

Philately

Television

See also

References